Gaelan Alexander Draper (formerly Connell, born May 19, 1989) is an American actor and director.

Early life and education

Connell was born in Washington, D.C. and raised in Silver Spring, Maryland. He has two brothers, Brendan and Shawn. He graduated from Bethesda-Chevy Chase High School and attended the New York University Tisch School of the Arts.

Career 
Connell appeared in 2000 in Chocolat as Didi Drou and in A Dirty Shame as "Horny Kid". He also guest starred in an episode of Law & Order . He played the lead role in Bandslam - a high school outcast who becomes popular after he manages a band and discovers he doesn't have to change himself to fit in. In 2011 he appeared as Wyatt Black in Cartoon Network's TV Movie Level Up.

In 2012, he was one of the founders of California Burrito, a quick-service restaurant chain in southern India.

In addition to acting, Connell is also a film director, having directed award-winning commercials for various brands as well as the independent feature film Blood, Sand and Gold, which was shot in six countries on a micro-budget.

Personal life 
In 2018, Connell married Meryl Draper, co-founder and CEO of Quirk Creative.

Filmography

Film

Television

References

External links

1989 births
American male child actors
American child singers
American male television actors
American people of Irish descent
Living people
Tisch School of the Arts alumni
Bethesda-Chevy Chase High School alumni
21st-century American singers